The Orangeburg massacre refers to the shooting of protesters by South Carolina Highway Patrol officers in Orangeburg, South Carolina, on the South Carolina State University campus on the evening of February 8, 1968. About 200 protesters had previously demonstrated against racial segregation at a local bowling alley. Three of the protesters, African-American males, were killed, and 28 other protesters were injured.

Background

Several incidents centering on the segregation of the local bowling alley, All-Star Bowling Lane, led up to the Orangeburg Massacre on February 8, 1968. In the fall of 1967, some of the black leaders within the community tried to convince Harry K. Floyd, the owner of the bowling alley, to allow African Americans. Floyd was unwilling to desegregate, and as a result, protests began in early February 1968.

On February 5, 1968, a group of around 40 students from South Carolina State University entered the bowling alley and left peacefully after they were asked to leave by Floyd. 
The next night more students led by John Stroman returned and entered the bowling alley. This time police were waiting for them, and several students were detained, including Stroman. After the arrests, more students began showing up, angry that protesters were being arrested. Next, the crowd broke a window of the bowling alley, and chaos ensued. Police began beating student protesters (both men and women) with billy clubs. That night, eight students were sent to the hospital.

Over the next few days, the tension in Orangeburg escalated. Student protesters submitted a list of demands for integration and eliminating discrimination within the community. The Governor of South Carolina at the time, Robert E. McNair, responded by calling in the National Guard after commenting that black power advocates were running amok in the community. Over the next two days, about 200 mostly student protesters gathered on the campus of South Carolina State University, a historically black college in Orangeburg, to demonstrate against the continued segregation at the bowling alley.

Conflict
On the night of February 8, 1968, students started a bonfire at the front of the campus of South Carolina State University. As police and firefighters attempted to put out the fire, officer David Shealy was injured by a heavy wooden banister that was taken from a nearby unoccupied house and thrown in his direction. Shortly after that (around 10:30 p.m.) South Carolina Highway Patrol officers began firing into the crowd of around 200 protesters. Eight patrol officers fired carbines, shotguns, and revolvers at the protesters for around 10 to 15 seconds. Twenty-seven people were injured in the shooting, most of whom were shot in the back as they ran away, and three African-American men were killed. The three men killed were Samuel Hammond Jr., Henry Smith (both SCSU students), and Delano Middleton, a student at the local Wilkinson High School. Middleton was shot while sitting on the steps of the freshman dormitory, awaiting the end of his mother's work shift.

The police later said they believed they were under attack by small arms fire. A newspaper reported: "About 200 Negros gathered and began sniping with what sounded like 'at least one automatic, a shotgun and other small caliber weapons' and throwing bricks and bottles at the patrolmen." Similarly, a North Carolina newspaper reported that week that students threw firebombs at buildings and that the sound of apparent sniper fire was heard.

Protesters insisted they did not fire at police officers but threw objects and insulted the men. Evidence that police were being fired upon at the time of the incident was inconclusive, and no evidence was presented in court, as a result of investigations, that protesters were armed or had fired on officers.

Aftermath
At a press conference the following day, Governor Robert E. McNair said the event was "...one of the saddest days in the history of South Carolina". McNair blamed the deaths on Black Power outside agitators and said the incident took place off campus, contrary to the evidence.

The federal government brought charges against the state patrolmen in the first federal trial of police officers for using excessive force at a campus protest. The state patrol officers' defense was that they felt they were in danger, and protesters had shot at the officers first. All nine defendants were acquitted, although 36 witnesses stated they did not hear gunfire from the protesters on the campus before the shooting, and no students were found to be carrying guns.

In a state trial in 1970, the activist Cleveland Sellers was convicted of a charge of riot related to the events on February 6 at the bowling alley. He served seven months in state prison, getting time off for good behavior. He was the national program director of the Student Nonviolent Coordinating Committee (SNCC). In 1973, he wrote The River of No Return: The Autobiography of a Black Militant and the Life and Death of SNCC. The governor of South Carolina officially pardoned Sellers in 1993.

The Smith–Hammond–Middleton Memorial Center, South Carolina State's on-campus arena, was renamed in honor of the three victims, opening the same year as the massacre.

List of those involved

Deaths
 Samuel Ephesians Hammond Jr., 18
 Delano Herman Middleton, 17
 Henry Ezekial Smith, 19

Injuries

 Herman Boller Jr., 19
 Johnny Bookhart, 19
 Thompson Braddy, 20
 Bobby K. Burton, 22
 Ernest Raymond Carson, 17
 John Carson
 Louise Kelly Cawley, 25
 Robert Lee Davis Jr., 19
 Albert Dawson, 18
 Bobby Eaddy, 17
 John H. Elliot
 Herbert Gadson, 19
 Samuel Grant, 19
 Samuel Grate, 19
 Joseph Hampton, 21
 Charles W. Hildebrand, 19

 Nathaniel Jenkins, 21
 Thomas Kennerly, 21
 Joe Lambright, 21
 Emma McCain, 19
 Richard McPherson, 19
 Harvey Lee Miller, 15
 Harold Riley, 20
 Cleveland Sellers, 23
 Patrolman David Shealy
 Ernest Shuler, 16
 Jordan Simmons III, 21
 Ronald Smith, 19
 Saundra Stephenson, 22
 Frankie Thomas, 18
 Robert Watson, 19
 Robert Lee Williams, 19
 Savannah Williams, 19

Highway Patrol personnel
 Patrol Lieutenant Jesse Alfred Spell, 45
 Patrol Lieutenant David E Parker Sr., 43
 Sgt. Henry Morrell Addy, 37
 Sgt. Sidney C. Taylor, 43
 Corporal Joseph Howard Lanier, 32
 Corporal Norwood F. Bellamy, 50
 Patrolman First Class John William Brown, 31
 Patrolman First Class Colie Merle Metts, 36
 Patrolman Allen Jerome Russell, 24
 Patrolman Edward H. Moore, 30
 Patrolman Robert Sanders, 44

Footnotes
 The injuries received by patrolman David Shealy preceded police opening fire on the crowd by five minutes.
 On the evening of the shootings, Cleveland Sellers was arrested while hospitalized; he was taken into custody and charged with inciting the riot, arson, assault and battery with intent to kill, property damage, housebreaking, and grand larceny. He received a full pardon in 1993.
 John H. Elliot was later added to the list of those injured. He was shot in the stomach but did not go to the hospital for treatment.

Media coverage

This was the first incident of its kind on a United States university campus. The Orangeburg killings received relatively little media coverage. The events predated the 1970 Kent State shootings and Jackson State killings, in which protesters against the Vietnam War were killed by the National Guard, and by the local and state highway patrol, respectively. The perceived overreaction by law enforcement helped galvanize public opinion against the war.

The historian Jack Bass attributed the discrepancy in media coverage partly due to the Orangeburg incident occurring after large-scale urban riots, which made it seem small by comparison. It may not have been considered newsworthy, especially since the shootings occurred at night, when media coverage, especially any television news, was less. In addition, the victims at Orangeburg were mostly young black men protesting against local segregation. Linda Meggett Brown wrote that subsequent events in the spring of 1968the assassination of Martin Luther King Jr., followed shortly by the assassination of Robert F. Kennedy, and events in the Vietnam Warovershadowed the events at Orangeburg.

At Kent State, by contrast, Bass noted that the victims were young white students protesting against the U.S. war in Vietnam, which had become increasingly unpopular and a highly politicized national issue. They were attacked by members of the National Guard, which the media may have judged was a more inflammatory aspect of the shootings. The black students at Jackson State were also protesting against the war, and the killings there took place shortly after those at Kent State. It appeared that law enforcement and university administrations had no idea about how to handle campus unrest. There was widespread public outrage over the events.

Legacy
South Carolina State University's gymnasium is named in memory of the three men killed. In their honor, a monument was erected on campus, and the site has been marked. All-Star Triangle Bowl became integrated.
 On August 9, 2013, a work crew fixed a spelling error on the Orangeburg Massacre Monument. Delano H. Middleton's name was mistakenly listed as Delano B. Middleton. One theory for the incorrect initial is that it was pulled from Middleton's nickname, "Bump". The error went unnoticed for over 40 years.
In 2001, Governor Jim Hodges attended the university's annual memorial of the event, the first governor to do so. That same year, on the 33rd anniversary of the killings, an oral history project featured eight survivors telling their stories at a memorial service. It was the first time survivors had been recognized at the memorial event. Robert Lee Davis told an interviewer, "One thing I can say is that I'm glad you all are letting us do the talking, the ones that were actually involved, instead of outsiders that weren't there, to tell you exactly what happened."
A joint resolution was introduced in the South Carolina state general assembly in 2003 and re-introduced in each of the next three sessions of the legislature to establish an official investigation of the events of February 8, 1968, and to establish February 8 as a day of remembrance for the students killed and wounded in the protest. However, the legislature never voted on the resolution.
The Orangeburg massacre was the subject of two films released on the 40th anniversary of the massacre in April 2008: Scarred Justice: The Orangeburg Massacre, 1968 by documentary filmmakers Bestor Cram and Judy Richardson; and Black Magic by Dan Klores.

See also
Protests of 1968
Greensboro massacre
List of killings by law enforcement officers in the United States
List of incidents of civil unrest in the United States

Notes

References

Bibliography
 Shuler, Jack. (2012), Blood and Bone: Truth and Reconciliation in a Southern Town. University of South Carolina Press.

Further reading
 Sellers, Cleveland L. (1998), "Orangeburg Massacre: Dealing honestly with tragedy and distortion", The Times and Democrat, January 24, 1998.
 
 Watters, Pat, and Rogeau, Weldon (1968). Events at Orangeburg; a report based on study and interviews in Orangeburg, South Carolina, in the aftermath of tragedy. Southern Regional Council, Atlanta.
 
 "Orangeburg 1968", photography and publication by Cecil J. Williams

External links
Brian Cabell, "Remembering the 1968 Orangeburg Massacre", February 8, 2001. Web posted at: 4:02 p.m. EST (2102 GMT). Accessed April 1, 2005.
Jack Bass, "Documenting the Orangeburg Massacre", Neiman Reports. Harvard University. Fall 2003. Accessed May 21, 2007.
Linda Meggett Brown, "Remembering the Orangeburg Massacre", Black Issues in Higher Education, March 1, 2001. Accessed April 1, 2005.
"On the Freedom Road: A Guardian reporter visits the All-Star Triangle Bowl", The Guardian, Accessed May 21, 2007.
Video
1968, Forty Years Later: A Look Back at the Orangeburg Massacre, Democracy Now!, 2008, Accessed April 3, 2008.
Scarred Justice: the Orangeburg Massacre 1968, a documentary distributed by California Newsreel.

1968 in South Carolina
1968 murders in the United States
1968 protests
Massacres in 1968
African-American history of South Carolina
Conflicts in 1968
Deaths by firearm in South Carolina
History of African-American civil rights
1968 mass shootings in the United States
Massacres committed by the United States
School massacres in the United States
African Americans shot dead by law enforcement officers in the United States
Police brutality in the United States
Protest-related deaths
Racially motivated violence against African Americans
School killings in the United States
South Carolina State University
University and college shootings in the United States
February 1968 events in the United States
Mass shootings in South Carolina
Law enforcement in South Carolina